Unnatural Selection (or stylized as, "unnatural selection") is a 2019 TV documentary series that presents an overview of genetic engineering and particularly, the DNA-editing technology of CRISPR, from the perspective of scientists, corporations and biohackers working from their home. It was released by Netflix on October 18, 2019.

Episodes
Unnatural Selection is a documentary series.

Season 1
The first season consists of 4 episodes. It became available for streaming on October 18, 2019.

Participants
The documentary TV series includes the following notable participants (alphabetized by last name):
 Andrea Crisanti – Italian microbiologist
 Nelson Dellis – American memory athlete
 Jennifer Doudna – American biochemist and Nobel laureate for CRISPR
 Victor Dzau – President, U.S. National Academy of Medicine
 Preston Estep – American geneticist and CSO of Veritas Genetics
 Kevin M. Esvelt – American biologist
 Katherine A. High – American doctor and CSO of Spark Therapeutics
 Juan Carlos Izpisúa Belmonte – Spanish geneticist
 Jeffrey Kahn – American professor of bioethics
 James Russell – New Zealand ecologist
 Aaron Traywick – American life extension activist
 Josiah Zayner – American biohacker, artist, and scientist
 John J. Zhang – Fertility Specialist

Reception 
According to reviewer Megan Molteni, writing for Wired Magazine, "Unnatural Selection chronicles the ambitions and struggles of scientists, doctors, patients, conservationists, and biohackers as they seek to wrest control of evolution from nature itself. They are all navigating the profound ethical dilemmas of a world where it’s possible to rewrite the code of life inside any organism, including human ... If you were looking for a Schoolhouse Rock! explanation of how Crispr works or a deep dive on the history of its discovery, Unnatural Selection won’t deliver ... All the requisite references will be made [in the series]—to Gattaca, to Huxley, to “life, uh, finds a way.” ... After watching Unnatural Selection you might not have a better understanding of how Crispr-Cas9 differs from Crispr-Cas12e, a, or b, but you’ll definitely have something to talk about on the subway."

According to reviewer Dream McClinton, writing for The Guardian, "For the [film-makers], the series had to tell the broader, more intricate story of genetic engineering, a story filled with great risk, benefits, consequences, emotions, sentiments and future, to better illuminate the field and further the discussion on the technology ... The series is haunted by feelings of ambivalence from the scientists who are cautious about tipping the scales towards a possible dystopian future .. Unnatural Selection demonstrates the worry of many, and the hope of others, threaded into a huge tapestry of possibility of a more perfect future ... While [one of the film-makers] doubts the series will change the minds of the public about genetic engineering, [he] hopes it will educate some about both the benefits and risks of genetic engineering."

There are other reviews of the series, including reviews from the TheReviewGeek and ReadySteadyCut.

See also

 Brave New World, 1932 Aldous Huxley novel
 Brief Answers to the Big Questions,2018 Stephen Hawking book
 Designer baby
 Human Nature (2019 CRISPR film documentary)
 Make People Better (2022 documentary)
 Lulu and Nana controversy
 Netflix TV documentary programs
 Prime editing

References

External links
 
 
 

2019 American television series debuts
2010s American documentary television series
English-language Netflix original programming
Netflix original documentary television series
Works about genetics